Saltdal is a municipality in Nordland county, Norway. It is part of the traditional district of Salten. The administrative centre of the municipality is the village of Rognan. Other villages in Saltdal include Røkland and Lønsdal.

The  municipality is the 26th largest by area out of the 356 municipalities in Norway. Saltdal is the 187th most populous municipality in Norway with a population of 4,617.

General information
The municipality of Saltdal was established on 1 January 1838 (see formannskapsdistrikt law). In 1949, a small area of Skjerstad Municipality (population: 10) was transferred to Saltdal. Other than that one change, the borders have never changed.

Name
The Old Norse form of the name must have been Salptardalr. The first element is the genitive case of the river name Salpt which means "strong steam", (now Saltdalselva, which runs through Saltdal) and the last element is dalr which means "valley" or "dale".

Coat of arms
The coat of arms was granted on 28 October 1988. The official blazon is "Gules, a rowan twig Or". This means the arms have a red field (background) and the charge is two rowan twigs. The rowan twig has a tincture of Or which means it is commonly colored yellow, but if it is made out of metal, then gold is used. This design was chosen to represent nature and the prevalence of rowan forests in the municipality. They are also canting arms because the Norwegian word for rowan is rogn and the municipal centre is the village of Rognan. The arms were designed by Arvid Sveen.

Churches
The Church of Norway has two parishes within the municipality of Saltdal. It is part of the Salten prosti (deanery) in the Diocese of Sør-Hålogaland.

History

During World War II, the Germans decided to lengthen the Nordland Line from Lønsdal in Saltfjellet going northwards. Over a period of three years, the original plan was to first have both the road and the railroad all the way to Narvik and then on to Kirkenes, but they only managed to build the railroad to Bodø.

The Germans continued to lengthen the road to Kirkenes, and it came to be known as Blodvegen ("the Blood Road") by locals. This project involved prisoners of war, mostly from Yugoslavia and the Soviet Union, in building this road under extremely harsh conditions. The workers lived in prison camps where they did not receive enough food for their hard work building the road. This caused many of the workers to collapse and die. A famous sign of this road is the blood cross one of the prisoners drew on the mountainside with his recently killed friend's blood. It has become a tradition to repaint this cross with red paint, so people who pass this will never forget what happened. It's still possible to walk this road, which stretches from Saltnes to Soksenvika. At Saltnes, you will find the Blood Road museum.

Saltdal was known for having some of the most horrifying prisoner-of-war camps in Norway during World War II. A grand total of 15-18 camps with 9,500 Russian, Polish, and Yugoslavian prisoners were located in the valley.

Government
All municipalities in Norway, including Saltdal, are responsible for primary education (through 10th grade), outpatient health services, senior citizen services, unemployment and other social services, zoning, economic development, and municipal roads. The municipality is governed by a municipal council of elected representatives, which in turn elect a mayor. The municipality falls under the Salten District Court and the Hålogaland Court of Appeal.

Municipal council
The municipal council of Saltdal is made up of 21 representatives that are elected to four-year terms. The party breakdown of the council is as follows:

Mayor
The mayors of Saltdal (incomplete list):
1999-2011: Kjell Magne Johansen (Ap)
2011-2015: Finn-Obert Bentsen (Ap)
2015–present: Rune Berg (Sp)

Geography

The main centre in the municipality is Rognan, on the southern shore of the Saltdal Fjord, where the valley floor meets the fjord. When the Ice age ended and the ice had melted 9,000 years ago, the valley was a fjord as the sea reached what is today an elevation of  due to isostatic depression. The valley is situated just north of the Arctic Circle.

Two national parks are partially in the municipality: Saltfjellet–Svartisen National Park in the southwest, and Junkerdal National Park in the eastern part. This makes Saltdal one of the municipalities in Norway with the largest percentage of protected areas within its borders. The river Saltdalselva runs through the valley. The riverbed appears very bright in some places due to the minerals in the sand. The valley is covered with pine forest and birch and other trees are common as well. Lakes in the region include Balvatnet, Fiskeløysvatnet, Kjemåvatnet, and Nordre Bjøllåvatnet. The mountain Ørfjellet is also located in the municipality.

Climate
The municipality lies on the northeastern side of the Saltfjellet mountains, in the rain shadow of the mountains. With mountains surrounding it in almost all directions, Saltdal is one of the driest areas in Norway, especially the upper part of the valley. For five years in a row, 2001 to 2005, and then again in 2007 and 2008, the weather station in the upper part of the Saltdal valley recorded the least precipitation in all of continental Norway, with only  in 2005. The weather station (81 m ASL) was situated in the upper part of the valley (Storjord) at a farm from 1982 to 2012. From 2013 onwards, the weather station (39 m) is situated about  down the valley at a camping site (Nordnes), but still in the upper part of the valley (Øvre Saltdal). Data from the first station (81 m) shows this to be the driest place in Norway (excluding Svalbard), with on average just over  precipitation annually.

In spite of the low precipitation, Saltdal has lush vegetation with meadows and forests on the side of the mountains due to the low temperatures reducing evapotranspiration. Due to the rarity of extreme cold snaps, the environment and plant hardiness resemble latitudes further south in the Nordic interior.

Located in an inland valley, Saltdal is also known for its warm summer days, frequently being one of Norway's warmest locations if the right weather situation occurs (with easterly or southeasterly winds blowing). It is not uncommon with daytime temperatures approaching and sometimes exceeding  in the summer months. Similarly, winter temperatures can be quite cold, often dropping below  on a clear day.

During a heatwave in June 2011, Saltdal recorded four days in a row with daytime temperatures exceeding .
The all-time low  was recorded January 2010.

Transportation
The European route E6 highway passes through the entire length of Saltdal, with the Nordland Line running alongside it. A road running east through the Junkerdalen valley (National Road 77) leads to Sweden. The nearest main airport is in Bodø, about 90 minutes from Rognan by road. There is a general aviation airport—Rognan Airport.

Economy
Saltdal has a great history in boat building out of local timber. Especially before World War II, the boatbuilding industry employed a large percentage of Saltdal's population.

Nowadays, the largest employer in Saltdal is Nexans. The company's Rognan factory specializes in telecommunication, fibre optics and copper cables. There is also some agriculture in Saltdal, and many people work within public services.

Notable people 

 Ludvig Kristensen Daa (1809 in Saltdal – 1877) a Norwegian historian, ethnologist, auditor, editor of magazines and newspapers, educator and politician
 Arne Hjersing (1860 in Saltdal – 1926) a Norwegian painter
 Bernhoff Hansen (1877 in Rognan – 1950) a Norwegian wrestler, gold medallist in the 1904 Summer Olympics
 Erling Engan (1910 in Saltdal – 1982) a Norwegian politician
 Trygve Henrik Hoff (1938 in Rognan – 1987) a Norwegian singer, composer, songwriter and writer
 Ragnhild Furebotten (born 1979 in Saltdal) a Norwegian fiddler, folk musician and composer
 Lena Kristin Ellingsen (born 1980 in Saltdal) a Norwegian actress

See also
Blodveien ["The blood road"]

References

External links

Municipal fact sheet from Statistics Norway 
Junkerdal National Park
Polarcircle center

 
Municipalities of Nordland
Valleys of Nordland
Populated places of Arctic Norway
1838 establishments in Norway